High School Mortar is situated in Mortar, in the Begusarai district of the state of Bihar, India. Mortar high school is the only high school serving the villages near Mortar, and students from the outlying villages travel to Mortar to study there.

High schools and secondary schools in Bihar
Begusarai district
Educational institutions in India with year of establishment missing